Koli Taal is an Indian Kannada satirical film written and directed by Abhilash Shetty. Koli Taal is a film about grandpa goes on an adventure to find the missing rooster and serve the chicken curry before his grandson leaves for town.

The film premiered at the 21st New York Indian Film Festival. It was then screened at various film festivals including the 18th Indian Film Festival of Stuttgart and 12th Indian Film Festival of Melbourne. It had its Indian premiere at Jio MAMI Mumbai Academy of the Moving Image 22nd Mumbai Film Festival.

Synopsis
Excited about the grandson's visit, an elderly couple plan to cook chicken curry for dinner. But, things go awry when the chicken goes missing.
Hence, grandpa goes on an adventure to find the rooster and serve the curry before his grandson leaves for town.

Cast 
 Radha Ramachandra as Vanaja
 Prabhakar Kunder as Mahabala Shetty
 Ganesh Mogaveera as Manja
 Sharath Devadiga as Sathisha
 Guruprasad Nairy as Haala
 Abhilash Shetty as Sumanth

Reception 
Cinestaan gave the film 3 out of 4 stars and said that "the frames and objects in the film feel so real, so alive that you can almost smell and touch them".
The Times of India gave 3.5 stars out of 5 saying "A heartwarming tale filled with light-hearted moments"
Deccan Herald rated 3.5 out of 5 stars.
Dallas Movie Screenings gave "A-" grade for the film and said "The film is completely filled with interesting regional customs based on their family living and their accustomed generations".

Awards and Nominations

References

External links